Bashmakov (from башмак meaning shoe) is a Russian masculine surname, its feminine counterpart is Bashmakova. It may refer to
Aleksandr Bashmakov (born 1950), Belarusian football coach
Isabella Bashmakova (1921–2005), Russian historian of mathematics

Russian-language surnames